Delphic may refer to:
Delphic (band), British band
 Uses as adjective:
 Of or connected with the city of Delphi, Greece
 Making of predictions:
 Delphic ambiguity
 Of or related to the Delphic Oracle in any way
 British ships:
 , launched 1897
 ,  launched 1918
 The Delphic Fraternity, Inc., also known as Delphic of Gamma Sigma Tau (ΓΣΤ),

See also

Delphi (disambiguation)